Karvansara is a town in the Gegharkunik Province of Armenia.  The name derives from caravanserai (Turkish for "inn").

See also 
Gegharkunik Province

References 

Populated places in Gegharkunik Province